Iris subg. Scorpiris, commonly called Juno, is a subgenus of Iris, representing the smooth-bulbed bulbous irises. For a while it was an independent genus Juno Tratt. in some classifications.

There are around 60 different species of Juno irises, making it the largest group of bulbous irises.
They generally have thick fleshy storage roots (between a few and to several) under a fleshy-like bulb. Most are native to the Middle East and Central Asia (excluding China). There is a single Mediterranean species, Iris planifolia.

All the species are dormant in summer and then grow leaves in mid-winter or early spring.

Many of the bulbs produce scented flowers. Most bulbs are not frost hardy and are best grown in a bulb frame or alpine house.

It consists of a single section, Scorpiris.

Section Scorpiris

Iris aitchisonii Baker
Iris albomarginata R.C.Foster
Iris almaatensis Pavlov
Iris aucheri (Baker) Sealy (including I. sindjarensis)
Iris baldshuanica O.Fedtsch.
Iris boissier Henriques
Iris bucharica Foster
Iris cabulica Gilli
Iris capnoides Vved.
Iris carterorum Mathew & Wendelbo
Iris caucasica Hoffm.
Iris cycloglossa Wendelbo
Iris doabensis Mathew 
Iris drepanophylla Aitch. & Baker 
Iris edomensis Sealy
Iris fosteriana Aitch. & Baker
Iris galatica Siehe
Iris graeberiana Sealy
Iris hippolyti Vved.
Iris hymenospatha Mathew & Wendelbo
Iris inconspicua Vved.
Iris khassanovii Tojibaev & Turginov
Iris kopetdagensis (Vved.) Mathew & Wendelbo
Iris kuschakewiczii B.Fedtsch
Iris leptorhiza Vved.
Iris linifolia Reg.
Iris magnifica Vved.
Iris maracandica (Vved.) Wendelbo
Iris microglossa Wendelbo
Iris narynensis O.Fedtsch.
Iris narbutii O.Fedtsch. 
Iris nicolai Vved.
Iris nusairiensis Monterode
Iris odontostyla Mathew & Wendelbo
Iris orchioides Carriere
Iris palaestina (Bak.) Boiss.
Iris parvula T.Hall & Seisums
Iris persica L.
Iris planifolia (Mill.) Fiori & Paol.
Iris platyptera Mathew & Wendelbo
Iris popovii Vved.
Iris porphyrochrysa Wendelbo
Iris postii Mouterde 
Iris pseudocaucasica Grossh.
Iris regis-uzziae Feinbrun
Iris rosenbachiana Reg.
Iris schischkinii Grossh.
Iris stenophylla Hausskn. (ex Baker)
Iris stocksii (Baker) Boiss
Iris subdecolorata Vved.
Iris svetlanae Vved. 
Iris tadshikorum Vved.
Iris tubergeniana Foster
Iris vicaria Vved.
Iris vvedenskyi Nevski
Iris warleyensis Foster
Iris wendelboi Grey-Wilson & Mathew
Iris willmottiana Foster
Iris xanthochlora Wendelbo
Iris zaprjagajevii Abramov
Iris zenaidae Botschant.

Hybrids
Several Scorpiris have been crossed by breeders to produce various hybrids.
Including;
 Iris Sindpers (I. aucheri X I. persica)
Between March and April, it has scented, bright sky-blue flowers with ruffled falls, with deeper blue edges. The deep yellow signals are covered with broken, purple lines. The standards are turquoise in colour. The broad style arms are long enough to cover half the falls. It grows to a height of 8 cm (3 in).
 Iris Sindpur (I. aucheri X I. galatica) 
 Iris Warlsind (I. warleyensis X I. aucheri)
Iris 'Warlsind' was created by a Dutch nurseryman called Thomas M. Hoog. It has standards that are pearl streaked with milk-blue. It also has bright yellow lozenges tipped with chocolate brown on its falls. It grows to a height of between 24 and 35 cm (10-14"). It is hardy in the US.

References

External links

Juno at plantarium.ru
List of most iris species

Iris (plant)
Plant subgenera